The Mayor of the Tees Valley, styled as the Tees Valley Mayor, is a combined authority metro mayor, first elected in May 2017. The mayor is leader of the Tees Valley Combined Authority.

The office was created under the Cities and Local Government Devolution Act 2016 which allowed for the creation of 'Metro mayors' to lead combined authorities in England. The next election for the post was scheduled for 7 May 2020 but due to the COVID-19 pandemic was postponed to May 2021.

List of mayors

List of deputy mayors

References

Tees Valley
Local government in County Durham
Local government in North Yorkshire
Directly elected mayors in England and Wales